Soufiane Alloudi (born July 1, 1983 in El Gara) is a Moroccan football striker currently playing for Kawkab de Marrakech.

In September 2007, Alloudi has transferred by Raja Casablanca to Al-Ain FC on a 3-year contract, his loan fee was reported to be 450.000 $.

He also plays for Morocco, for whom he scored a first-half hat-trick in 28 minutes against Namibia in their opening match of the 2008 Africa Cup of Nations. Alloudi left the field before the end of the game, injured. After this injury, Morocco failed to qualify for the quarter finals of the African Nations Cup and hence, the loss of Alloudi was said to be one of the reasons for this result.

Al Ain FC

Soufiane was loaned to Al Ain FC in 2007 from Raja Casablanca and quickly won the hearts of the staff, teammates and fans. When his loan expired Al Ain FC managed to buy him from Raja Casablanca on a 3-year contract. He has some quick paces on both left and right sides of the wing.
They were many speculations linking him to numerous European clubs, Olympique Marseille tried several times to sign him but weren't successful.
Soufiane revealed recently that he has tied up a contract with Al-Ain FC that would keep him with them up till 2011, and if they were interested he would be more than happy to extend his contract.

During the summer of 2009 he was loaned out to Raja Casablanca until the end of the season to recover from his current injury. And in January 2010, Soufiane was loaned for a duration of 6 months to Al Wasl FC where he spent the remaining of the 2009-10 season. During his short spell with Al Wasl FC the club was able to win the 2009–10 Gulf Club Champions Cup.

International goals

References

External links

1983 births
Living people
Moroccan footballers
Footballers from Casablanca
Morocco international footballers
2008 Africa Cup of Nations players
Association football forwards
Botola players
Raja CA players
Al Ain FC players
Al-Wasl F.C. players
AS FAR (football) players
Kawkab Marrakech players
Moroccan expatriate footballers
Expatriate footballers in the United Arab Emirates
Moroccan expatriate sportspeople in the United Arab Emirates
UAE Pro League players